The Bridge of Tiberius or Bridge of Augustus is a Roman bridge in Rimini, Italy. The bridge features five semicircular arches made of white Istrian stone with an average span length of ca. 8 m. Above the arches lied niches framed with pilasters carrying entablatures and pediments. They were framed on the arch bridge's walls. Modillions supported cornices were covered by a coping at the top. An inscription commemorating the construction of the bridges was located near the coping. Construction work started during Augustus' reign and was finished under his successor Tiberius in 20 AD; an inscription thus calls the structure as "given by both emperors".
The bridge was the only crossing of the Marecchia not destroyed by the retreating German army during the Battle of Rimini as it was judged militarily pointless.
The bridge is still open to pedestrian and vehicular traffic, with the exception of heavy goods vehicles.

See also 
 List of Roman bridges
 Roman architecture
 Roman engineering

References

Further reading

External links 

 
 Traianus – Technical investigation of Roman public works

Ponte d'Augusto
Roman bridges in Italy
Deck arch bridges
Stone bridges in Italy
Bridges completed in the 1st century
Tourist attractions in Emilia-Romagna
Transport in Emilia-Romagna
Tiberius